Triple top line (abbreviated as TTL or 3TL) is first mentioned by McDonough and Braungart (2002). The triple bottom line, an accounting framework coined by John Elkington in 1994, focuses on aligning sustainability and the intentions of a business when it comes to profit, whereas triple top line is a focus to align sustainability and business profitability from the inception of a product. The TTL approach is an integral part of the process from the beginning of a product's development through its future development and marketing strategic planning.

References

Sustainable development